is a passenger railway station located in the city of Kodaira, Tokyo, Japan, operated by East Japan Railway Company (JR East).

Lines
Shin-Kodaira Station is served by the Musashino Line between Fuchūhommachi and Nishi-Funabashi, with some trains continuing to Tokyo via the Keiyō Line.

Station layout
The station consists of two side platforms serving two tracks, and is located in a cutting between the 4,381 m long Higashimurayama Tunnel to the north and the 2,562 m long Kodaira Tunnel to the south.

Platforms

History
The station opened on 1 April 1973.

Passenger statistics
In fiscal 2019, the station was used by an average of 11,448 passengers daily (boarding passengers only). The passenger figures for previous years are as shown below.

Surrounding area
 Ōmekaidō Station (on the Seibu Tamako Line)
 Tsuda College
 Kodaira Hirakushi Denchu Art Museum

See also
List of railway stations in Japan

References

External links

 JR East station information 

Railway stations in Japan opened in 1973
Stations of East Japan Railway Company
Railway stations in Tokyo
Musashino Line